Below is a list of squads used in the 1982 African Cup of Nations.

Group A

Cameroon
Coach:  Branko Žutić
|

Ghana
Coach:  Charles Gyamfi

Libya
Coach:  Bela Gotl
|

Tunisia
Coach:  Ryszard Kulesza
|

Group B

Algeria
Coach: Mahieddine Khalef
|

Ethiopia
Coach: Mengistu Worku
|

Nigeria
Coach:  Otto Glória
|

Zambia
Coach:  Ted Dumitru replaced by  Ante Bušelić
|

References

External links
FIFA
Ghana squad on Ghana Home Page

Africa Cup of Nations squads
1982 African Cup of Nations